Enarmes are the leather gripping straps attached to the back of shields throughout the Medieval period.

Enarmes were held in place by riveting through the leather and the facing of the shield, and reinforced with small, square-cut washers. Enarmes are visible on shields in the Bayeux Tapestry.

See also 
 Guige

References 
 

Medieval shields